Lieutenant Colonel Anthony Charles Richards, CVO (born 1953) is a British Army officer, who has served as Equerry to HM The Queen and Deputy Master of the Household of the Royal Household since 1999.

Career
Richards was educated at Marlborough College. After attending the Royal Military Academy, Sandhurst he commissioned into the Welsh Guards, in which he served 1973–1999. Since 1999 he has been on retired pay.

From 1973 to 1982 he served with the 1st Battalion of the Welsh Guards in the United Kingdom, and the British Army of the Rhine (BAOR). He was seconded to the 1st Battalion of the 2nd Gurkha Rifles in Hong Kong (1982–1984). He attended the Staff College, Camberley and qualified for the staff (psc) in 1985. In the same year he was promoted to major. From 1986 to 1990 he was in the BAOR.

Between 1990 and 1992 Richards was second in command of the 1st Battalion of the Welsh Guards in the United Kingdom. He was then Staff Officer Headquarters London District (1992–1994). Promoted to Lieutenant Colonel, he was Equerry to the Duke of Edinburgh (1994–1997), Followed by being Divisional Lieutenant-Colonel Foot Guards (1997–1999).

He was appointed a Member of the Royal Victorian Order in 1997 and advanced to Lieutenant in the same order in 2006. Following Her Majesty's Diamond Jubilee, Richards was promoted to a Commander of the Royal Victorian Order for his service during the Diamond Jubilee and to the Royal Family.

References

1953 births
Commanders of the Royal Victorian Order
Equerries
Graduates of the Royal Military Academy Sandhurst
Living people
People educated at Marlborough College
Welsh Guards officers